Reem Mansour (born 20 December 1993) is an Egyptian recurve archer. She competed in the archery competition at the 2016 Summer Olympics in Rio de Janeiro.

In 2019, she competed in archery at the 2019 African Games held in Rabat, Morocco.

References

External links
 

Egyptian female archers
Living people
Place of birth missing (living people)
1993 births
Archers at the 2016 Summer Olympics
Olympic archers of Egypt
African Games gold medalists for Egypt
Competitors at the 2019 African Games
African Games medalists in archery
21st-century Egyptian women